Sheila Maureen Bisilliat (born  February 16, 1931) is an English-born Brazilian photographer.

Early life

She was born in Englefield Green, Surrey, daughter of the painter Sheila Brannigan (1914 - 1994) and a diplomat.  She studied painting with André Lhote in Paris, in 1955, and at New York's Art Students League with Morris Kantor in 1957.

She came to Brazil for the first time in 1952, establishing herself in 1957, in the city of São Paulo.  In her words, "Brazil was a search for roots which I did not have as a child. I was born in England, yes, but I lived in many places. My father was a diplomat, which forced me to live a sort of a chameleonic life. Fate tied me to Brazil. It was a willfull stay."

From 1962, she abandoned painting and began to dedicate herself to photography. She worked as a photojournalist for Editora Abril, between 1964 and 1972 - in the magazine Quatro Rodas but became especially prominent in the defunct magazine Realidade.

Between 1972 and 1992, together with her second husband, the Frenchman Jacques Bisilliat, and the architect Antônio Marcos Silva, founded the O Bode folk art gallery. During this period, she travelled through Brazil in search of works by popular artists and craftsmen, to compose the gallery's collection. Also at that time, in 1988, at the request of the anthropologist Darcy Ribeiro, Maureen, Jacques and Antônio Marcos are invited to work in the formation of the Latin American popular art collection of the Fundação Memorial da América Latina in São Paulo. For this, the three traveled through Mexico, Guatemala, Ecuador, Peru and Paraguay, collecting pieces for the permanent collection of the Memorial's Creativity Pavilion, from which Maureen has since become a curator.

Maureen Bisilliat got a Guggenheim Fellowship, in 1970;  a grant from the National Council for Scientific and Technological Development (1981 - 1987), from the São Paulo Research Foundation (1984 - 1987) and from the Japan Foundation (1987).

In December 2003, her complete photographic work, with more than 16,000 images, including photographs, black and white negatives and colored cards, in the 35mm and 6 cm x 6 cm formats, was incorporated into the Instituto Moreira Salles photographic collection.

In 17 March 2010, she was awarded the Order of Ipiranga by the São Paulo state government.

Published books 
She published a number of photography books inspitred on the work of Brazilian writers:

 A João Guimarães Rosa. São Paulo: Gráficos Brunner, 1969.
 A Visita, 1977, inspired on the poem of same name by  Carlos Drummond de Andrade;
 Sertões, Luz e Trevas. São Paulo: co-edição Editora Raízes e Rhodia, 1982 (inspired on Euclides da Cunha  Os Sertões)
 O Cão sem Plumas. Rio de Janeiro: Editora Nova Fronteira, 1983 (inspired on the poem of same name by João Cabral de Melo Neto;
 Chorinho Doce, 1995,with poems by Adélia Prado;
 Bahia Amada Amado. São Paulo: Empresa das Artes, 1996 (with texts by Jorge Amado).

Other notable books by her are Xingu: Detalhes de uma Cultura (São Paulo: Editora Raízes, 1978),Xingu: Território Tribal (London: William Collins & Sons, 1979) and Terras do Rio São Francisco (São Paulo: co-edition Editora Raízes and BEMGE, 1985).

Exhibitions 
In 1985 she exhibits in a special room at the 18th São Paulo Art Biennial a photographic essay inspired by the book O Turista Aprendiz, by Mário de Andrade.

Vídeo 
Since the 1980s, she has devoted herself to video work, notably the Xingu / Terra feature documentary, shot with Lúcio Kodato, in the Mehinako village in the Upper Xingu.

Individual exhibitions 

 1965 – Museu de Arte de São Paulo Assis Chateaubriand
 2010 – Galeria FIESP
 2011 - Museu Oscar Niemeyer - Curitiba

Collective exhibitions 

 1971 – Fotógrafos de São Paulo, Museu de Arte Contemporânea da Universidade de São Paulo
 1975 – Xingu/Terra (Sala Especial), 13ª Bienal Internacional de São Paulo
 1979 – Xingu/Terra, Museum of Natural History, New York City
 1985
 1ª Quadrienal de Fotografia, Museu de Arte Moderna de São Paulo
 O Turista Aprendiz (Sala Especial), 18ª Bienal Internacional de São Paulo
 1987 – O Turista Aprendiz (Sala Especial), Salon de la Photographie, Paris, França
 1989 – Teatro do Presídio (Sala Especial), Seção de Teatro da 20ª Bienal Internacional de São Paulo
 1992 – Brasilien: entdeckung und selbstentdeckung, Kunsthaus, Zürich, Switzerland
 1995 – Fotografia Brasileira Contemporânea. Centro Cultural Banco do Brasil, Rio de Janeiro
 1998 – Amazônicas. Itaú Cultural, São Paulo
 1999 – Brasilianische Fotografie, Kunstmuseum Wolfsburg, Germany
 2003 – Labirintos e Identidades: a fotografia no Brasil de 1945 a 1998, Centro Universitário Maria Antônia, São Paulo
 2004 – Brasileiro Brasileiros. Museu Afro-Brasil, São Paulo
 2004 – São Paulo 450 Anos: a imagem e a memória da cidade no acervo do Instituto Moreira Salles, Centro Cultural Fiesp, São Paulo

Awards 
In 1987, Maureen Bisilliat received the Best Photographer Award from the São Paulo Association of Art Critics.

References

1931 births
Living people
People from Surrey
Brazilian women photographers
Naturalized citizens of Brazil
British emigrants to Brazil
Pages with unreviewed translations
Brazilian people of English descent